Palatine Bridge is a village in Montgomery County, New York, United States. The population was 737 at the 2010 census. The basis of the name is the community's location in a region settled by Palatine Germans. The Village of Palatine Bridge is in the Town of Palatine. The community is in the western part of the county, west of Amsterdam.

History
Palatine Bridge was settled in 1723.

A bridge across the Mohawk River here built in 1798 gave the community its name.

The village was incorporated in 1867.

The Frey House, Palatine Bridge Freight House, and Webster Wagner House are listed on the National Register of Historic Places. In 2019 most of the developed portion of the village was listed on the Register as the Palatine Bridge Historic District.

Geography
Palatine Bridge is located at  (42.910890, -74.574827).

The village is on the north side of the Mohawk River across from the Village of Canajoharie and the New York State Thruway.

New York State Route 5 (Grand Street) passes through Palatine Bridge, where it intersects with New York State Route 10 (Lafayette Street).

Demographics

As of the census of 2010, there were 737 people, 311 households, and 182 families residing in the village. The population density was 795.2 people per square mile (306.3/km2). There were 335 housing units at an average density of 344.6 per square mile (132.7/km2). The racial makeup of the village was 98% White, 0.1% African American, 0.5% Asian, and 1.1% from two or more races. Hispanic or Latino of any race were 1.6% of the population.

There were 311 households, out of which 21.2% had children under the age of 18 living with them, 58.5% were married couples living together, 9.3% had a female householder with no husband present, and 41.5% were non-families. 23.2% of all households were made up of individuals, and 43.7% had someone living alone who was 65 years of age or older. The average household size was 2.13 and the average family size was 2.72.

In the village, the population was spread out, with 13.2% under the age of 18, 7.8% from 18 to 24, 16.7% from 25 to 44, 30% from 45 to 64, and 31.2% who were 65 years of age or older. The median age was 53 years. For every 100 females, there were 86.3 males. For every 100 females age 18 and over, there were 76.4 males.

The median income for a household in the village was $29,773, and the median income for a family was $58,393. Males had a median income of $53,083 versus $31,667 for females. The per capita income for the village was $25,854. About 8.1% of families and 11.8% of the population were below the poverty line, including 1.4% of those under age 18 and 13.4% of those age 65 or over.

Notable people
Eli Cook, former Mayor of Buffalo, New York
Anthony Dimond, Alaska judge and politician
George Alonzo Johnson, businessman
John G. McMynn, Superintendent of Public Instruction of Wisconsin, educator
Webster Wagner, local postmaster, state politician, and railroad inventor

See also

National Register of Historic Places listings in Montgomery County, New York

References

External links
Canajoharie/Palatine Bridge information

Villages in New York (state)
Historic districts on the National Register of Historic Places in New York (state)
National Register of Historic Places in Montgomery County, New York
Populated places established in 1723
Villages in Montgomery County, New York
Palatine German settlement in New York (state)
1723 establishments in the Thirteen Colonies
Populated places on the Mohawk River